Sadio Doumbia and Fabien Reboul were the two-time defending champions but lost in the final to Jesper de Jong and Bart Stevens.

De Jong and Stevens won the title after defeating Doumbia and Reboul 3–6, 7–5, [10–8] in the final.

Seeds

Draw

References

External links
 Main draw

Garden Open - Doubles
2022 Doubles